

Denefrith was a medieval Bishop of Sherborne.

Denefrith was consecrated in 793. He died between 796 and 801.

Citations

References

External links
 

Bishops of Sherborne (ancient)
8th-century English bishops
Year of death uncertain
Year of birth unknown